Poinsett Bridge is the oldest bridge in South Carolina and perhaps in the entire southeastern United States. Named for Joel Roberts Poinsett, it was built in 1820 as part of a road from Columbia, South Carolina, to Saluda Mountain. The stone bridge, which includes a  Gothic arch and stretches  over Little Gap Creek, may have been designed by Robert Mills, architect of the Washington Monument. Though no longer in use, the bridge remains largely intact and is part of the  Poinsett Bridge Heritage Preserve. There is a nature trail a few hundred yards from the bridge.The bridge, about which ghost stories have been told for decades, is located off U.S. Highway 25 north of Greenville, South Carolina. The bridge was added to the National Register of Historic Places in 1970.

See also
List of bridges documented by the Historic American Engineering Record in South Carolina

References

External links

Buildings and structures in Greenville County, South Carolina
Bridges completed in 1820
Road bridges on the National Register of Historic Places in South Carolina
Historic American Engineering Record in South Carolina
National Register of Historic Places in Greenville County, South Carolina
Transportation in Greenville County, South Carolina
Stone arch bridges in the United States